The 2010–11 Meralco Bolts season was the first season of the franchise in the Philippine Basketball Association (PBA). The team took over the Sta. Lucia Realtors after the franchise was sold to Manila Electric Company in August 2010.

Key dates
August 29: The 2010 PBA Draft took place in Fort Bonifacio, Taguig.

Draft picks

Roster

Philippine Cup

Eliminations

Standings

Commissioner's Cup

Eliminations

Standings

Governors Cup

Eliminations

Standings

Transactions

Pre-season

Trades

Philippine Cup

Trades

Commissioner's Cup

Free agents

Additions

Trades

Imports recruited

References

Meralco Bolts seasons
Meralco